The Imperial-Royal or Imperial Austrian Army was strictly speaking, the armed force of the Holy Roman Empire under its last monarch, the Habsburg Emperor Francis II, although in reality, it was nearly all composed of the Habsburg army. When the Holy Roman Empire was dissolved in 1806, it assumed its title of the troops of the Austrian Empire under the same monarch, now known as Emperor Francis I of Austria.

Background to the army
The name "Imperial-Royal Army" was used from 1745, as "Imperial" referred until 1804 to the Holy Roman Empire and from 1804-1867 to the Austrian Empire. "Royal" referred to the Kingdom of Bohemia. (not to be confused with "Imperial and Royal" used after 1867 were the "Royal" referred to the Kingdom of Hungary)

The key feature of the army of the Austrian Empire during the Revolutionary and Napoleonic Wars (1792–1815) was that, due to the multi-national nature of the territories, regiments were split into German units (which included Czech-troops recruited from Bohemia, Moravia and Silesia, Polish and Ruthenian units recruited from the territory of Galicia, Flemings and Walloons territory of the former Austrian Netherlands, and Italians) and Hungarian units (which included troops from Croatia, Serbia and Transylvania).

Conscription resulted in elements of untrained men in every battalion, a problem exacerbated by incoherent training across the regions. The army was beset by constant government frugality and several reorganisations. A Militär-Hof-Commission sat for six years from 1795 (known as the Nostitz-Rieneck commission and from 1798, Unterberger) to overhaul the kit, producing the simpler 1798-pattern uniform, the famous crested helmet and a standard  musket, copied from the French 1777 pattern. Although some regiments were disbanded in 1809 following the loss of their recruiting-grounds, others were allocated new areas yet kept their old designations; for example, the Walloon regiments whose recruiting areas were transferred to Galicia.

Key victories over the French were won at Neerwinden, Würzburg, Stockach, Caldiero, Aspern-Essling and Leipzig, while major defeats were suffered at Jemappes, Fleurus, Rivoli, Marengo, Hohenlinden, Ulm, Austerlitz and Wagram.

The most powerful individual in the Army of the Austrian Empire during the period was Archduke Charles, who implemented wide-ranging and modernising reforms, particularly following the crushing defeat at Austerlitz. Charles was responsible for the severe check Napoleon suffered at the battle of Aspern-Essling, but after the subsequent defeat at Wagram retired from active command.

The Austrian army also played a significant role in the Neapolitan War of 1815 by taking down Murat's regime, and beat a vastly bigger Neapolitan army at the battle of Tolentino.

The Staff
In a great irony of history, it was the French attaché to the Austrian court, Montazet, whose memorandum was used by Count Leopold Joseph von Daun in January 1758 in a letter to the Empress Maria Theresa to press for a more important role for the Generalquartiermeister (Chief of Staff). The failures in the army, especially at the Battle of Leuthen made it clear that Austria had no “great brain” and the command needed to spread the workload to allow the Commander-in-chief the time to consider the strategic picture. The 1757 regulations had created the Grosse Feldgeneralstab and Kleine Generalstab and after changes in 1769, a permanent staff of 30 officers was established under the Director, Franz Moritz von Lacy, which would be expanded in wartime with junior officers. The Grosse staff was divided into three: First, the Intrinsecum, which handled internal administration and directing operations; secondly, external activities, including the Pioneers; thirdly, the Inspection Service, which handled the issuing of orders and prisoners of war. Alongside the General Staff was the General Adjutant, who led a group of Adjutant staff selected by the army commanders to handle the details of internal administration and collating intelligence, and answered to the Commander-in-chief. The Chief of Staff became the chief adviser to the Commander-in-chief and, in a fundamental move away from the previous administrative role, the Chief of Staff now undertook operational planning, while delegating the routine work to his senior staff officers. Staff officers were drawn from line units and would later return to them, the intention being that they would prove themselves as leaders during their time with the staff. In a battle or when the army had detached corps, a small number of staff would be allocated to the column commander as a smaller version of headquarters. The senior man, usually a Major, would be the chief of the column staff and his principal task would be to help the commander to understand what was intended.

When Karl Mack von Leiberich became chief of staff of the army under Prince Josias of Saxe-Coburg-Saalfeld in the Netherlands, he issued the Instruktionspunkte fur die gesamte Herren Generals, the last of 19 points setting out the roles of staff officers, dealing with offensive and defensive operations, while helping the Commander-in-chief. In 1796, Archduke Charles, Duke of Teschen augmented these with his own Observationspunkte, writing of the Chief of Staff: “he is duty bound to consider all possibilities related to operations and not view himself as merely carrying out those instructions”. On 20 March 1801, Feldmarschalleutnant Duka became the world's first peacetime Generalquartiermeister at the head of the staff and the wartime role of the Chief of Staff was now focused on planning and operations to assist the Commander. Archduke Charles, Duke of Teschen himself produced a new Dienstvorschrift on 1 September 1805, which divided the staff into three: 1) Political Correspondence; 2) the Operations Directorate, dealing with planning and intelligence; 3) the Service Directorate, dealing with administration, supply and military justice. The Archduke set out the position of a modern Chief of Staff: “The Chief of Staff stands at the side of the Commander-in-Chief and is completely at his disposal. His sphere of work connects him with no specific unit”. “The Commander-in-Chief decides what should happen and how; his chief assistant works out these decisions, so that each subordinate understands his allotted task”. With the creation of the Korps in 1809, each had a staff, whose chief was responsible for directing operations and executing the overall headquarters plan. The staff on the outbreak of war in 1809 numbered over 170. Finally in 1811, Joseph Radetzky von Radetz produced his Uber die bessere Einrichtung des Generalstabs, which prioritised the Chief of Staff’s managerial and supervisory role with the departments (Political Correspondence, Operations and Service)under their own directors, effectively merging the Adjutants and General Staff officers. In this system lay the beginnings of a formal staff corps, whose members could specialise in operations, intelligence and logistics.

Recruitment
Recruitment in the German areas was by voluntary enlistment and a scheme of conscription, which was for lifetime service before 1802, ten years thereafter. All able-bodied men between 17 and 40 were liable, although the many exemptions for the nobility, skilled trades, most townsfolk and married men, meant the bulk were drawn from the younger sons of rural peasants and the urban proletariat. Recruits for Hungarian regiments were organised by the Hungarian Assembly of Nobles Diet of Hungary by quotas in each county.

Each regiment had its own zone of recruitment within the Empire. The only exception to this was the Poles of Galicia, who were initially recruited in 'Aushilfsbezirke' (supplementary recruitment districts, before being organised into proper recruitment districts from 1808).

Officers
All regiments had an honorary colonel-in-chief, the 'Inhaber', whose title the regiment bore, but he only exercised a formal authority to confirm the appointment of junior officers within that regiment. Contrary to French Revolutionary propaganda that Austrian officers were largely from the lesser aristocracy, most officers were recruited as cadets or appointed from within the regiments.

The infantry
At the outset of war in 1793, the army numbered fifty-seven line regiments, including two grenadier companies each. Seventeen Grenzer light infantry regiments, three garrison regiments and the Stabs Infanterie Regiment for HQ duties. In addition, irregular Frei-Corps light infantry battalions were raised in wartime.

Line regiments
From 1768 until 1805, a line regiment typically consisted of two field battalions – Leib- and Oberst- battalions – each of six fusilier companies; also, a grenadier division of two companies, which were normally detached to form composite grenadier battalions with those of two other regiments. In addition, it included one garrison battalion (Oberstleutnant – Battalion) composed of four companies which served as a source for reserves at the regiment depot. The established strength of a 'German' line regiment in theory was 4,575 men, though this number was rarely above 2–3,000, especially in peacetime. With three battalions, 'Hungarian' regiments had a nominal strength of 5,508.

Company strength
The line company had four officers – 
Hauptmann (captain) 
Oberleutnant (1st lieutenant)
Unterleutnant (2nd lieutenant)  
Fähnrich (ensign)

The NCOs in a line company numbered 14 and included –
Feldwebel (sergeant)
Four Corporals (corporals)
Fourierschützen (quartermaster, or furir)
Eight Gefreiter (lance corporals)

The 1769 regulations show the original peacetime company strengths at 113 per company in peacetime (The 'Kopf' figure down the left side of the regulations) and from Entwurf 5 on p. 81, the wartime strength expanded to 115 in the Grenadiers and 152-4 in the fusiliers.

In addition, the company had three musicians and a Zimmermann (pioneer). Wartime company strengths of all other ranks ranged from 120–230; grenadier companies between 112–140.

In 1805, a new organisation was implemented under Karl Mack von Leiberich, creating six battalions, each of four companies, per regiment: The senior Grenadier (or Leib) Battalion comprised the two former Grenadier companies and two companies of infantry (in the 1798 pattern helmet) The army reverted to its former 1798 organisation on 6 December 1806

Light Infantry

The Grenzers formed the basis of the light infantry.

In 1808, IR64 was broken up and its nine divisions formed the rifle-armed cadre divisions (two companies), which were each augmented by two divisions of carbine-armed troops to form the nine new Jäger battalions.

Regulations 1757–1805

A) 1769 reglement fur die sammtliche kaiserlich-konigliche Infanterie was the main service and drill regulation:

a) Vol 1 covers the functions of each rank, military justice, camps and pickets plus report forms

b) Vol 2 covers the service regulations for each rank, camp rules, basic drill and forming of basic tactical formations

B) 1769 Generals-Reglement is the Austrian generalcy and staff manual

C) The 1757 Artillery regulation was originally produced as part of Lichtenstein's overhaul.

The Reform Period regulations 1806–15

Archduke Charles, Duke of Teschen emphasised education of the troops and officers in particular. So, the Second Reform period (1806–08) produced a stepped series of manuals:

A) Dienst-reglement für die K.k.Infanterie was the basic service manual with job descriptions and service regulations

B) Abrichtungs-Reglement (1806) was basic drill regulation up to company level

These two were the basic regulations, which had to known by every soldier.

C) Exercier Reglement für die K.K. Infanterie (1807) was the higher level drill regulation up to regiment size and had to be known by NCOs and officers

D) Beiträge zum practischen Unterricht im Felde für die Officiere der österreichischen Armee (1806–13) were a series of booklets for the education of junior officers. All of them are quite short at 35-80pp with diagrams 

No. 1) (1806) covers outposts and patrols 

No. 2) (1807) covers reconnaissances and marches to the front, flank and rear 

No. 3) (1808) covers skirmishing, both with the third rank and in the light infantry sense 

No. 4) (1808) covers attacking and defending both woodland and villages plus fighting in a position with several villages 

No. 5) (1808) covers the attack and defence of positions held by large bodies of troops, including  outflanking them 

No. 6) (1810) covers attack and defence of defiles, crossing rivers and attack and defence of mountain passes 

No. 7) (1811) covers feints and demonstrations, observation and siege of fortresses, leading, defending and attacking supply trains 

No. 8) (1813) covers obtaining supplies and foraging, winter positions for small and large forces 

E) Grundsätze der höheren Kriegs-Kunst für die Generäle der österreichischen Armee (1806) was a small book about strategy for the senior generals, updated as Grundsätze der höheren Kriegskunst und Beyspiele ihrer zweckmässigen Anwendung für die Generale der Österreichischen Armee (1808)

Tactics

The introduction of new regulations in 1805 and 1807 did little to disrupt the traditional three-rank line formation of battalions in action, and the use of the 'battalion-column' for movement. Having led the way in skirmishing tactics amongst its light infantry and employing the third ranks of line battalions, Austria tried to expand those light troops with Freikorps raised in wartime and from 1808, formalised and separate Jäger battalions. The  1807 Exercier-Reglemnt formalised the training of infantry skirmishers as organic to their battalions and the employment of Masses (closed-up battalions and two-company divisions) in the more densely-packed battlefields. While still vulnerable to artillery, the formation was more than adequate against cavalry and easier to deploy around the battlefield.

The Artillery

Some guns still exist: There are 3pdr trails in Forchtenstein Castle; a 3pdr 1814 gun in the Zeughaus in Graz Austria; two 6pdr trails and a limber with ammunition box in the Schlossberg Castle in Graz; barrels outside the Museum of Military History, Vienna  and in a covered external area.; a reconstructed 6pdr in the Military Museum in Budapest; a short 1753 18pdr siege gun is in the Royal Artillery Museum collection is now in long-term storage. There are unconfirmed rumours of a 6pdr gun and a 6pdr Cavalry gun in Moscow, painted red and captured from the Saxon contingent of Napoleon's 1812 army.

See also
 Austro-Hungarian Army
 Imperial Army of the Holy Roman Empire
 Weapons of the Austro-Hungarian Empire
 Flags of the Imperial Austrian Army of the Napoleonic Wars

References

Further reading
 Bassett, Richard. For God and Kaiser: The Imperial Austrian Army, 1619–1918 (2016).
 Fremont-Barnes, G. (editor) Armies of the Napoleonic Wars 2011
 Fremont-Barnes, G. (editor) The Encyclopedia of the French Revolutionary and Napoleonic Wars: A Political, Social, and Military History 2006
 Dawson, Dawson & Summerfield: Napoleonic Artillery (2007)
 Haythornthwaite, P. Austrian Army of the Napoleonic Wars (1) Infantry (Osprey Men-At-Arms 176) 1986
 Haythornthwaite, P.: Austrian Army of the Napoleonic Wars (2) Cavalry (Osprey Men-At-Arms 181) 1986
 Haythornthwaite, P.: Austrian Specialist Troops of the Napoleonic Wars (Osprey Men-At-Arms 223) 1990
 Hollins, D.: Austrian Auxiliary Troops 1792–1816 (Osprey Men-At-Arms 299) 1996
 Hollins, D.: Austrian Frontier Troops 1740–1798 (Osprey Men-At-Arms 413) 2005
 Hollins, D.: Austrian Napoleonic Artillery 1792–1815 (Osprey New Vanguard 72) 2003
 Hollins, D.: Austrian Grenadiers and Infantry 1788–1816 (Osprey Warrior 24) 1998
 Hollins, D.: Hungarian Hussar 1756–1815 (Osprey Warrior 81) 2003
 Hollins, D. Austrian Commanders of the Napoleonic Wars 1792–1815 (Osprey Elite 101) 2004
 Rothenberg, G. Napoleon’s Great Adversaries (Batsford, London) 1982 (rep.1995)
 Encerbi, E. 'The Austrian Imperial-Royal Army 1805–1809'  http://www.centotredicesimo.org/wp-content/uploads/2015/10/ACERBI-The-Austrian-Imperial-Army-1805-09.pdf

In German
 Kriegsgeschichtliche Abteilung des k.u.k. Kriegsarchivs: Kriege gegen die französische Revolution (Seidel, Vienna) 1905
 Kriegsgeschichtliche Abteilung des k.u.k. Kriegsarchivs: Krieg 1809 (Seidel, Vienna) 1907
 Kriegsgeschichtliche Abteilung des k.u.k. Kriegsarchivs: Befreiungskriege (Kriegsarchiv, Vienna) 1913
 Osterreichische Militärische Zeitschrift (Streffleur, Vienna) 1808–1918
 Regele, O.: Generalstabschefs aus vier Jahrhunderten  (Vienna) 1966
 Rauchensteiner, M: Kaiser Franz und Erzherzog Carl (Verlag für Geschichte und Politik, Vienna) 1972
 Dolleczek, A.: Monographie der k.u.k. österr.-ung. Blanken und Handfeuer-Waffen (1896/rep.1970)
 Sagvari, G. & Somogyi, G.: Das Buch der Husaren (Magyar Konyvklub) 1999

Military history of Austria
Military history of Austria-Hungary
Armies of Napoleonic Wars
1804 establishments in the Austrian Empire
Military units and formations established in 1804